Filip Ungar (born 14 January 1995) is a Serbian footballer who last played for Cement Beočin.

Career
Filip Ungar started playing in Serbia in fourth–level clubs Vrbas, Polet Sivac and ŽSK Žabalj.

He made his professional debut for Zlaté Moravce against Trenčín on 13 March 2015. Then he played two seasons with Dukla Banská Bystrica before returning to Serbia.

In summer 2017 he signed with Serbian First League side Inđija.

References

External links
 FC ViOn Zlaté Moravce profile
 Fortuna Liga profile
 Futbalnet profile
 Eurofotbal profile

1995 births
Living people
Serbian footballers
Association football defenders
FC ViOn Zlaté Moravce players
FK Dukla Banská Bystrica players
Slovak Super Liga players
Expatriate footballers in Slovakia
Serbian expatriate sportspeople in Slovakia
FK Inđija players
Serbian First League players
FK Cement Beočin players
People from Vrbas, Serbia